was a Japanese physical geographer and climatologist. He served as the founder and chairman of the International Geographical Union's (IGU) Commission on Climatology from 1988 to 1992, as well as the Vice President of the IGU from 1992 until 1996. He was a full professor at Hosei University (1969–1974), University of Tsukuba (1974–1991) and Aichi University (1991–1998).

In 1980, Yoshino served as the Secretary General of the International Geographical Congress' conference in Tokyo. He had been a foreign honorary member of the Romanian Academy since 1992, and a recipient of the IGU's Lauréat d'Honneur award in 2000. He died on July 4, 2017, at the age of 89.

References

1928 births
2017 deaths
Japanese climatologists 
Japanese geographers
Physical geographers
Honorary members of the Romanian Academy